Topalhasan is a village in the Tercan District, Erzincan Province, Turkey. The village had a population of 21 in 2021.

References 

Villages in Tercan District